Shahab Adeli is an Iranian football player who currently plays as a goalkeeper for Baaderaan in the Azadegan League.

Club career

Sepahan

Last Update:27 August 2019

References

Iranian footballers
1997 births
Living people
Association football goalkeepers
Footballers at the 2018 Asian Games
Asian Games competitors for Iran
Naft Tehran F.C. players